Joseph Van Arsdale France (October 3 1912 – October 13 1999) is credited with establishing the process for training new employees in Disney-owned and other "theme parks" around the world.

Early career
Prior to working for Disney, his skills in labor relations landed France a job as director of education for the Fort Worth Division of General Dynamics. His work in labor relations and training next led him to an appointment as a civilian educational consultant for the U.S. Army in England and later, Germany.

Upon France’s return to the U.S., he became superintendent of industrial relations for Kaiser Aluminum Corporation's Mead Works and director of labor relations for Kaiser Frazer in Michigan.

He also opened a small paper goods business in Rhode Island.

Disney career
Van joined Disney in March 1955, and over the years, performed many roles at Disneyland, including area manager of Tomorrowland, conducting training of line supervisors, organizational chairman of the Disneyland Recreation Club, and coordinator of the first Disneyland Cast Member magazine, "Backstage Disneyland."

In 1978, he retired from Disney and became a special consultant at Disneyland.

After Disney
He also went on to author Old Dogs Can Learn New Tricks, a career guide for senior working adults, as well as his autobiography, Window On Main Street, 35 Years of Creating Happiness at Disneyland Park. He remained an active member of the Disneyland Alumni Club and spoke on Disneyland history at conventions around the country.

Death
At age 87, on October 13, 1999, Van Arsdale France died of pneumonia in Newport Beach, California.

References

1912 births
1999 deaths
People from Seattle
Walt Disney Parks and Resorts people
American expatriates in the United Kingdom
American expatriates in Germany